John Alexander Blair (c.1871 – 12 April 1911) was a New Zealand rugby union player who represented the All Blacks in 1897. His position of choice was hooker. Blair did not play in any test matches as New Zealand did not play their first until 1903.

Blair was educated at Wanganui Collegiate where he was a member of the 1st XV in 1886.

Career 
Blair was the first player from Wanganui to represent his country. Out of the Kaierau club, Blair played many times for the provincial side.

He played in the inaugural North against South Island match in 1897. Based on this performance Blair was selected for the All Blacks to go on their tour to Australia that same year.

He played in eight of the ten matches on the tour, scoring one try as well as a conversion.

He also played in the game against Auckland once they returned.

Blair continued playing for Wanganui until 1900.

Family 
His father, Duncan, also played rugby union. His mother's name was Agnes.

He had at least five sisters and two brothers.

References 

New Zealand rugby union players
New Zealand international rugby union players
1911 deaths
People educated at Whanganui Collegiate School
Wanganui rugby union players
Rugby union players from Whanganui
Rugby union hookers